Vepriai is the largest impact crater in Lithuania, named after the town of Vepriai located at its center. The crater is not exposed to the surface, having been eroded and covered by sedimentary rocks during the last glacial period.

The meteorite struck soft sandstone and limestone rocks thus its initial depth exceeded  but the site was soon covered by sedimentary rocks, sand and clay. A small lake has formed in the Jurassic in the impact site.

The crater was reported in 1978, as proven by occurrence of shatter cones and impact glass in drill-core samples acquired during a geophysical research of the locality.

References

Further reading 
  Masaitis, V. L., Danilin, A.N., Maschak, M.S., Raykhlin, A.I., Selivanovskaya, T.V. and Shadenkov,Ye.M., The Geology of Astroblemes. Leningrad, Nedra, 231 p. 1980
  Motuza, G. B., Gailius, R. P., On presumed astroblemes of Latvia (abstract). 7th Annual Conference of the Committee on Tectonics of Belarus and the Baltic Area, Vilnius, pp. 91–94. 1978
  Henning Dypvik1 et al., Impact structures and events - A Nordic perspective, Episodes, vol. 31 No. 1, March 2008 (PDF)

External links 
 More information about Vepriai impact crater

Impact craters of Lithuania
Jurassic impact craters